Walther is both a given name and a surname.

Walther may also refer to:

 Walther (crater), on the Moon
 Walther Arms, a German arms manufacturer
 Walther Avenue, Baltimore, Maryland
 Walther Boulevard, Baltimore County, Maryland

See also
 Walter (name)
 Walther's Law, in geology